Puțintei is a commune in Orhei District of Moldova. It is composed of three villages: Dișcova, Puțintei and Vîprova.

References

Communes of Orhei District